EL Aquilae, also known as Nova Aquilae 1927 was a nova that appeared in 1927.   It was discovered by Max Wolf on photographic plates taken at Heidelberg Observatory on 30 and 31 July 1927 when it had a photographic magnitude of 9. Subsequent searches of plates taken at the Harvard College Observatory showed the nova was fainter than magnitude 11.1 on 8 June 1927 and had flared to magnitude 6.4 on 15 June 1927.   It declined from peak brightness at an average rate of 0.105 magnitudes per day, making it a fast nova, and ultimately dimmed to about magnitude 21.   The 14.5 magnitude change from peak brightness to quiescence was unusually large for a nova.

All novae are binary stars, with a "donor" star orbiting a white dwarf so closely that matter is transferred from the donor to the white dwarf.  Pagnotta & Schaefer argued that the donor star for the EL Aquilae system is a red giant, based on its position in an infrared color–color diagram.  Tappert et al. suggest that Pagnotta & Schaefer misidentified EL Aquilae, and claim that EL Aquilae is probably an intermediate polar, a nova with a main sequence donor star, based on its eruption amplitude and color.

Notes

References

Novae
Aquila (constellation)
Aquilae, EL